Beypazarı is a town and district of Ankara Province in the Central Anatolia region of Turkey, approximately 100 km west of the city of Ankara. According to the 2000 census, the population of the district is 46,493, of which 35,775 live in the town of Beypazarı.
The district contains three other small towns (Karaşar, Uruş, Kırbaşı) and 64 villages. It used to be an important city in Asia Minor in ancient times.

Etymology
The name Beypazarı means The Bey's market in Turkish, as in the Ottoman period this was an important military base and the cavalry stationed here were an important element of the local economy.

History
The area has a long history of occupation by Hittites, Phrygians, Ancient Romans, Byzantines, Seljuk Turks and the Ottoman Empire. Beypazarı was known as Lagania, meaning 'rocky peak' in the Luwian language during the Roman and Byzantine times, and the town was a regional administrative center.

Like most Luwian cities located in West Anatolia, Lagania supported the Trojans during the famous Trojan war. Lagania belonged to Tectosagae in the region of Galatia, which was occupied early in the 3rd century BC by Celtic tribes. The Gallic region was later (189 BC) subjected by the Romans. It became a Roman province in 25 BC, and was split into two provinces, Galatia Prima and Galatia Secunda, in the 390s. Lagania was in the province of Galatia Prima, and received the name Anastasiopolis during the reign of Emperor Anastasius I after he had visited the city and liked it so much.

The town was also an episcopal see, suffragan of the Metropolis of Ancyra (modern Ankara), mentioned by the  up to the 12th and 13th centuries. No longer a residential bishopric, Lagania remains a titular see of the Roman Catholic Church.

The town was conquered by the Seljuk Turks in the 12th century and was settled by various lords of the Oghuz Turks, eventually becoming part of the Ottoman Empire. Gazi Gündüzalp, the grandfather of Osman I, the founder of the Ottoman Empire, is buried in the village of Hırkatepe in the district.

Beypazarı today

Beypazarı today is a small town in a rural district famous for its carrots, (producing nearly 60% of Turkey's carrots), silverwork (Telkari), and a high quality natural mineral water. The crystal mineral trona, a kind of natural soda used in glass-making is extracted in Beypazarı.
With its rich history, architectural heritage and attractive rocky countryside Beypazarı is becoming increasingly attractive to visitors, especially day-trippers from Ankara. The cobbled streets of white Ottoman period buildings are particularly attractive; many of the old houses have been restored as hotels and restaurants (and are also popular with Turkish film directors looking for authentic locations. Every June the town holds its popular Traditional Historical Houses, Handicrafts, Carrot and stew Festival. The visitors of course are bringing valuable income to the town, shopping for silverware  and providing good custom for the food markets and restaurants.

For many visitors a major attraction is the cuisine, which includes typical Turkish dishes such as the yoghurt drink ayran, cracked wheat (or flour), yoghurt, and vegetables fermented then dried and mixed with water to make a thick soup tarhana, stuffed vine leaves, home-made sausage mumbar, and a stew cooked in a stone-oven called güveç. Sweets include the sweet cream pudding called höşmerim and pastries including a dry buttery biscuit called Beypazarı kurusu, and a renowned 80-layer baklava. They are also very inventive with their carrots, drinking carrot juice and producing carrot-flavoured Turkish Delight and carrot ice-cream. Beypazarı is surrounded by good farmland and the fresh ingredients are a large part of why Beypazarı's cooking is so popular with visitors. One of the best-known eateries is the restored Ottoman house, the Taş Mektep restaurant. A popular gift to take back home is the sticky sausage-shaped sweet made from dried molasses-like grape syrup stuffed with walnut cevizli sucuk.

The town is unusual in Turkey, for celebrating a religious festival (Regaip Kandili, the conception of the prophet Muhammad) with lights and fireworks.

Beypazarı is a member of the European Association of Historic Towns and Regions (EAHTR).

Mayor of Ankara Mansur Yavaş was born in the district and he was the mayor of Beypazarı between 1999 and 2009.

Administrative structure

Towns
 Karaşar
 Kırbaşı
 Uruş

Villages

Places of interest

 Hıdırlık Tepesi, a hilltop view of the town
 Ottoman period buildings include the 17th-century Suluhan Caravanserai and the 13th-century Sultan Alaedin Mosque
 The Kültür Evi museum, displaying items from Hittite, Roman, Byzantine, and Ottoman times
 Inözü Valley, a steep-walled canyon, giving access to the caves, tombs, and churches carved into the rock

Notes

References

External links

 District municipality's official website 
 District governor's official website 
 The Unique Tourism Site of Beypazari 
 Beypazarı local news website 
 Travel guide to Beypazarı 
 Beypazarı Facebook Official Fan Page 
 Series of travel articles about Beypazari

 
Populated places in Ankara Province
Districts of Ankara Province
Lagania
World Heritage Tentative List for Turkey